Strike Bowling Bar is an Australian-based company that owns and operates 13 venues along the east-coast of Australia and 2 venues in Western Australia.  Strike Bowling is currently Australia's largest privately owned bowling chain. 

Strike Bowling Bar along with the Australian division of Sky Zone Trampoline Park, Holey Moley Golf Club and Archie Brothers Cirque Electric forms one of the four entertainment brands owned by Funlab which has been established since 2002 by Michael Schreiber.

Strike Bowling Bar is known for its theme of vaporwave aesthetics.

Strike Publicity

QV2.0 Unveiling and Launch of Casino Heist Escape Room 
Strike threw a launch party for the grand unveiling of QV2.0 and launch of Casino Heist Escape Room, including live appearance from The Potbelleez in October 2015.

Fitzy & Wippa's 'Strike from Work' Strike Party 
Around  200 people went on strike from work on Thursday 6 June 2013 and headed along to Strike Bowling Bar at the Entertainment Quarter in Moore Park for Fitzy and Wippa's Strike Party.

Social media powered flight 
In April 2012, in the middle of Melbourne Central Shopping Centre, Strike Bowling launched their media manager 40 feet into the air using the power of Facebook shares, likes, tweets and Instagram. Every social interaction was met with more helium into the balloons, engaging the public.

Live on the Lane 
Strike launched 'Live on the Lane' in June 2011 at Strike King Street Wharf, Sydney with Bag Raiders headlining the event and DJs, Alison Wonderland and Homophobics as supporting acts.

Ruby Rose Fashion Launch 
In 2010, Ruby collaborated with the Australian fashion label Milk and Honey. The launch party took place at Strike Bowling Bar Moore Park in 2011.

Ruby Rose at Strike Charlestown Square Launch Party 
Star DJ and entertainment personality Ruby Rose was among the first to test the lanes at the Strike Bowling Bar VIP launch party at Charlestown Square in November 2010. Rose joined members of the Newcastle Knights, Zoo magazine calendar girls and multiple competition winners for bowling, cocktails and karaoke.

Celebrity visits

Angelina Jolie takes the family bowling 
Whilst in Queensland, Australia filming Unbroken, Angelina Jolie visited Sydney with her children, and took them bowling at Strike Bowling Bar Entertainment Quarter, Moore Park. The Bowling Bar staff said the family were "lovely" and didn't want a "big deal" made over them.

References

Notes

Sources

Further reading

External links
 

Australian companies established in 2002
Drinking establishments in Australia
Entertainment companies of Australia
Bowling alleys
Ten-pin bowling in Australia